Appenzell railway station is a railway station in the district of Appenzell, in the Swiss canton of Appenzell Innerrhoden. It is located at the junction of the  Appenzell–St. Gallen–Trogen and Gossau–Wasserauen lines of Appenzell Railways.

Services 
 the following services stop at Appenzell:

 St. Gallen S-Bahn:
 : half-hourly service to Trogen.

References

External links 
 
 

Railway stations in the canton of Appenzell Innerrhoden
Appenzell Railways stations